Dmitry Aleksandrovich Korshakov (born March 21, 1991) is a Russian professional basketball player who currently plays for MBA Moscow of the Russian Basketball Super League 1.

References

External links
 Dmitry Korshakov at eurobasket.com
 Dmitriy Korshakov at euroleague.net

1991 births
Living people
BC Krasny Oktyabr players
PBC CSKA Moscow players
Basketball players from Moscow
Power forwards (basketball)
Russian men's basketball players
Small forwards